The gens Occia was a minor plebeian family at Rome.  Members of this gens are first mentioned under Tiberius, but must have been at Rome for much longer; for Tacitus speaks of Occia, a Vestal Virgin who died in AD 19, after serving faithfully for fifty-seven years.  A few of the Occii pursued political careers in this period, but most are known only from inscriptions.

Members

 Occia, a Vestal Virgin, died in AD 19, after performing her priestly duties for fifty-seven years.
 Occia C. f., buried at Rome, aged sixty.
 Occia C. f., buried at Tarquinii, aged sixty.
 Decimus Occius D. f., the patron and former master of Decimus Occius Eros, mentioned in an inscription from Rome.
 Gaius Occius M. f., one of the municipal officials at Pompeii.
 Lucius Occius L. f., the former master of Lucius Occius Aristo and Occia Agathea, named in a funerary inscription from Cures in Sabinum.
 Manius Occius M'. f., one of the judicial magistrates at Signia in Latium.
 Occia L. l. Agathea, a freedwoman buried at Cures.
 Lucius Occius L. l. Agathopus, the freedman of Lucius Occius Helius, to whom he dedicated a monument at Rome.
 Occia Agile, wife of Quintus Anquirinnius Secundus, with whom she dedicated a monument to their son, Quintus Anquirinnius Severus, at Pisae.
 Publius Occius P. l. Anchialus, a freedman buried at Aquileia in the province of Venetia et Histria.
 Lucius Occius L. l. Aristo, a freedman buried at Cures.
 Occia Auge, wife of Pomponius Gaetulus, buried at Theveste in Africa Proconsularis, aged thirty-seven.
 Gaius Occius M. f. Basillus, buried at the present site of Ksar Mahidjiba, perhaps originally Castellum Fabatianum, in Numidia, aged twenty-one.
 Titus Occius Castus, buried at Tubusuctu in Mauretania Caesariensis.
 Publius Occius P. l. Dunomarus, a freedman buried at Aquileia.
 Quintus Occius Epigonus, a freedman, who dedicated a monument to Quintus Occius Narcissus at Puteoli in Campania.
 Occius Eutyches, husband of Fortunatia Veratia, named in an inscription from Dea Augusta Vocontiorum in Gallia Narbonensis.
 Occius Flamma, proconsul of Crete under the emperor Tiberius.
 Lucius Occius Helius, the patron and former master of Lucius Occius Agathopus, buried at Rome.
 Lucius Occius Hermia, named in an inscription from Rome.
 Decimus Occius D. l. Eros, a freedman, mentioned in two inscriptions from Rome.
 Occia Fotis, dedicated a monument at Rome in memory of her son, Lucius Occius Maximus.
 Occia Fortunata, buried at Masculula, aged fourteen years, seven months.
 Publius Occius Julianus, buried at Potentia in Lucania, aged seventeen.
 Lucius Occius Martialis, mentioned in an inscription from Madauros in Africa Proconsularis.
 Occius Macrini f. Martialis, buried at the site of the present village of Bordj M'Raou, formerly in Africa Proconsularis, age eighteen.
 Lucius Occius Maximus, the son of Occia Fotis, was born pridie Nonas Novembres, and buried at Rome, aged twenty-four years, eight months, and twenty-four days.
 Quintus Occius Narcissus, buried at Puteoli.
 Gaius Occius C. l. Philomusus, a freedman buried at Rome.
 Lucius Occius L. l. Philomusus, a freedman named in an inscription from Rome.
 Occia Primitiva, the wife of Marcus Licinius Apollonius, with whom she dedicated a monument to her son, Marcus Licinius Probus, aged four years, three months, and twenty-one days.
 Lucius Occius Primitivus, dedicated a monument at Rome to his friend, Marcus Terentius Silvius.
 Occius Priscus, dedicated a monument at Rome to Occia Thallusa.
 Occius Publilius Eutychus, dedicated a monument to his wife, Claudia Olympias, who was buried at Rome, aged forty-nine.
 Publius Occius Quintillianus, buried at Milevum in Numidia.
 Marcus Occius Ruso, one of a group of pontifices sent to the colony of Sutrium in Etruria.
 Gaius Occius Saturninus, buried at Thamugadi in Numidia, aged twenty-one.
 Gaius Occius Similis Blera, a secutor tribuni mentioned in a list of soldiers at Rome, dating to AD 113.
 Occia Spicula, wife of Caecilianus, buried at Thagura in Africa Proconsularis.
 Occia Sponde, wife of Marcus Junius Fortunatus, buried at Rome, aged thirty-three years and forty-two days.
 Occia Tertulla, dedicated a monument to her brother, Gaius Elvius Sextinus, at Nemausus in Gallia Narbonensis.
 Occia Thallusa, buried at Rome.
 Occia C. l. Trallis, a freedwoman, buried at Rome.
 Occia Verecunda, named in a funerary monument from Carnuntum in Pannonia Superior.

Footnotes

See also
 List of Roman gentes

References

Bibliography
 Lucius Annaeus Seneca (Seneca the Elder), Controversiae.
 Publius Cornelius Tacitus, Annales.
 Dictionary of Greek and Roman Biography and Mythology, William Smith, ed., Little, Brown and Company, Boston (1849).
 Theodor Mommsen et alii, Corpus Inscriptionum Latinarum (The Body of Latin Inscriptions, abbreviated CIL), Berlin-Brandenburgische Akademie der Wissenschaften (1853–present).
 Wilhelm Henzen, Ephemeris Epigraphica: Corporis Inscriptionum Latinarum Supplementum (Journal of Inscriptions: Supplement to the Corpus Inscriptionum Latinarum, abbreviated EE), Institute of Roman Archaeology, Rome (1872–1913).
 Bulletin Archéologique du Comité des Travaux Historiques et Scientifiques (Archaeological Bulletin of the Committee on Historic and Scientific Works, abbreviated BCTH), Imprimerie Nationale, Paris (1885–1973).
 René Cagnat et alii, L'Année épigraphique (The Year in Epigraphy, abbreviated AE), Presses Universitaires de France (1888–present).
 Paul von Rohden, Elimar Klebs, & Hermann Dessau, Prosopographia Imperii Romani (The Prosopography of the Roman Empire, abbreviated PIR), Berlin (1898).
 Stéphane Gsell, Inscriptions Latines de L'Algérie (Latin Inscriptions from Algeria, abbreviated ILAlg), Edouard Champion, Paris (1922–present).
 Emile Espérandieu, Inscriptions Latines de Gaule (Narbonnaise) (Latin Inscriptions from Gallia Narbonensis, abbreviated ILGN), Ernest Leroux, Paris (1929).
 Annona Epigraphica Austriaca (Epigraphy of Austria Annual, abbreviated AEA) (1979–present).
 Silvio Panciera, La collezione epigrafica dei musei Capitolini (The Epigraphic Collection of the Capitoline Museum, abbreviated CECapitol), Quasar Edizioni, Rome (1987).
 Giovanni Battista Brusin, Inscriptiones Aquileiae (Inscriptions of Aquileia, abbreviated InscrAqu), Udine (1991–1993).

Roman gentes